The Fokker F.XXIV was a 1930s passenger airliner design by the Dutch aircraft manufacturer Fokker.

History
Due to the success of the Douglas DC-3, Fokker's role in the global market for passenger aircraft was severely diminished. Whereas KLM was historically an important customer to Fokker, even they turned to other suppliers. When in 1938 KLM ordered the Douglas DC-5 in the US and showed interest in the DC-4C, Fokker realised it had to come to terms with the new era.

In an attempt to revive the glory days, Fokker finally adopted an all-metal approach with a new design, dubbed Model 193. Intended to replace the obsolete and outdated F.XXII and F.XXXVI models, Fokker had to use new technologies instead of designs based on wooden wings and few metal parts in the fuselage. Later on, this model became known as the F.XXIV.

Whereas KLM was state-owned, Fokker used its political influence to force a sale from KLM.  Finally in October 1939, KLM ordered four F.XXIVs. This sale was part of a broader package which also included the Douglas DC-4C, the Lockheed Excalibur and another Fokker design known as Model 180.

The F24 as it was proposed, was a short-range all-metal twin-engine passenger aircraft. It was supposed to be powered by two Wright Cyclone radial engines of 1,193 kW (1,600 hp) each. Its fuselage was designed for 26 passengers. The single aisle cabin layout had eight rows of two abreast on the right and eight rows of a single seat on the left. A cargo bay was put between the passenger cabin and the cockpit. This cockpit had a layout for a crew of four. In the middle of the passenger cabin was a galley. At the aft side of the cabin was a toilet with another cargo bay.

However the project never materialised as World War II broke out.  During the war, design work was continued. After the war, Fokker could not deliver the planes on short notice as its factories were largely destroyed. Subsequently, KLM turned to American suppliers like Convair and Douglas. The F24 design attracted no other airlines and the project ended as Fokker turned to more modern designs.

Specifications

See also

Fokker F27
Convair 240

References

F.XXIV
Abandoned civil aircraft projects
High-wing aircraft
Twin piston-engined tractor aircraft